Rafael Bush (born May 12, 1987) is a former American football safety who played nine seasons in the National Football League (NFL). He played college football at South Carolina State and was signed by the Atlanta Falcons as an undrafted free agent in 2010. He has also played for the Denver Broncos, Detroit Lions, New Orleans Saints, and Buffalo Bills.

Professional career

Atlanta Falcons
After going undrafted in the 2010 NFL Draft, Bush signed with the Atlanta Falcons on April 26, 2010. He was released on September 4, 2010 and signed to the Falcons' practice squad the next day. The team promoted him to the active roster on December 29, 2010. He was released during final cuts on September 3, 2011, but re-signed to the practice squad the following day.

Denver Broncos
On October 17, 2011, Bush was signed away from the Falcons' practice squad by the Denver Broncos.

New Orleans Saints
On September 1, 2012, Bush was signed by the New Orleans Saints. Bush was noted for wearing #25 with the team, which was notably worn by Reggie Bush during the latter's tenure with the team.

Bush was a restricted free agent after the 2013 season, and he signed an offer sheet with the Falcons that would have returned him to Atlanta for reported compensation of about $4.5 million for two years. However, on April 7, 2014, the Saints exercised their right to match the Falcons' offer and bring Bush back to New Orleans. During the 2015 season, he played in the Saints' season opener at Arizona before being placed on injured reserve for the remainder of the season at the recommendation of Dr. Charlie Sommerfeld.

Detroit Lions
On March 12, 2016, the Detroit Lions signed Bush to a one-year contract. In Week 6 against the Los Angeles Rams, Bush made his first interception as a Lion. The Rams were trailing by 3 in the two minute warning of the 4th quarter, and Bush intercepted Case Keenum, which sealed the victory for the Lions. Bush made his first career touchdown against the Jacksonville Jaguars in Week 11. He picked up a tipped ball, and returned it for 39 yards and a touchdown. Bush's interception was first in the video Top 10 Most Athletic Plays of Week 11 on NFL.com.

New Orleans Saints (second stint)
On March 30, 2017, Bush signed with the Saints. He recorded 23 tackles during the year.

Buffalo Bills
On March 14, 2018, Bush signed a two year, $4.5 million contract with the Buffalo Bills.

On July 19, 2019, Bush announced his retirement from the NFL.

NFL statistics

References

External links

New Orleans Saints bio

1987 births
Living people
American football safeties
People from Williston, South Carolina
Players of American football from South Carolina
South Carolina State Bulldogs football players
Atlanta Falcons players
Denver Broncos players
New Orleans Saints players
Detroit Lions players
Buffalo Bills players